Soreykhan-e Sofla (also Romanized as Soreykhān-e Soflá; also known as Kalāt-e Sarīkhān, Sarā-ye Khān, Sarīkhān, Sarkhūn, and Soreykhān) is a village in Arabkhaneh Rural District, Shusef District, Nehbandan County, South Khorasan Province, Iran. At the 2006 census, its population was 134, in 43 families.

References 

Populated places in Nehbandan County